Agar Assembly constituency is one of the 230 assembly constituencies of Madhya Pradesh a central Indian state. Agar is a segment of Dewas Lok Sabha constituency.

Members of Vidhan Sabha

 By-election

Election results

2020 bypoll

See also
 Agar Malwa district
 Agar
 Dewas (Lok Sabha constituency)

References

Agar Malwa district
Assembly constituencies of Madhya Pradesh